Foro Subregion is a subregion in the Northern Red Sea region (Zoba Foro) of Eritrea. Its capital lies at Foro.

Overview
The town is situated near the coast. A confluence of the Haddas, Aligide and Comaile River's runs through the district. During the 1960s, there was significant agricultural development on the district's alluvial plains.

Notes

References
Subregions of Eritrea

Northern Red Sea Region
Subregions of Eritrea